Brickellia nutanticeps is a Mexican  species of flowering plant in the family Asteraceae. It is native to central Mexico (Hidalgo, Veracruz, Puebla, México State, Morelos, Michoacán, Oaxaca).

References

nutanticeps
Flora of Mexico
Plants described in 1818